Heroina (trans. Heroine) was a Croatian and former Yugoslav music magazine.

History
Heorina was founded in 1990 as an independent magazine. The magazine's first Editor-in-Chiefs was Branko Maleš. The first issue was released on December 14, 1990, and after the sixth issue, released in June 1991, Heroina was put out.

The magazine was renewed in 1994 under the name Heroina Nova (The New Heroine). Nova Heroina was published by Glas Slavonije under the editorship of Zoran Jačimović. The first issue was released in January 1994, and the last, 41st issue, in July 1998.

References

1990 establishments in Yugoslavia
1998 disestablishments in Croatia
Magazines published in Croatia
Croatian music history
Croatian-language magazines
Defunct magazines published in Croatia
Magazines established in 1990
Magazines disestablished in 1998
Music magazines
Yugoslav rock music
Magazines published in Yugoslavia